Ch'ŏngdan County is a county in South Hwanghae province, North Korea.

Administrative divisions
Ch'ŏngdan county is divided into 1 ŭp (town), 1 rodongjagu (workers' district) and 22 ri (villages):

References

Counties of South Hwanghae